A list of films produced in Egypt in 1933. For an A-Z list of films currently on Wikipedia, see :Category:Egyptian films.

External links
 Egyptian films of 1933 at the Internet Movie Database
 Egyptian films of 1933 elCinema.com

Lists of Egyptian films by year
1933 in Egypt
Lists of 1933 films by country or language